Roy Parks Brashear (January 3, 1874 – April 20, 1951) was an American professional baseball infielder. He played in Major League Baseball (MLB) from – for the St. Louis Cardinals and Philadelphia Phillies. His brother, Kitty Brashear, also played in the Majors.

External links

1874 births
1951 deaths
Major League Baseball infielders
Baseball players from Ohio
St. Louis Cardinals players
Philadelphia Phillies players
St. Joseph Saints players
Bloomington Blues players
Sioux City Cornhuskers players
Mattoon Indians players
Minneapolis Millers (baseball) players
Louisville Colonels (minor league) players
Kansas City Blues (baseball) players
Vernon Tigers players
Los Angeles Angels (minor league) players
Portland Beavers players
Seattle Giants players
Louisville Colonels (minor league) managers
Sportspeople from Ashtabula, Ohio